Mountains in Glacier National Park (U.S.) are part of the Rocky Mountains. Mount Cleveland at 
is the highest peak in the park.  Many peaks in Glacier National Park have both English and anglicized versions of native American names.  The names listed here reflect the official names in the USGS U.S. Board on Geographic Names database.

Clark Range
The Clark Range is mostly in the Canadian Provinces of Alberta and British Columbia, but a small portion of the range is also in the far northwestern section of the park in Montana.

 Long Knife Peak - ;

Lewis Range
The Lewis Range traverses the park in a generally north to south direction on the eastern side of the continental divide.

 Ahern Peak - : 
 Allen Mountain - : 
 Almost-a-Dog Mountain - : 
 Amphitheater Mountain - : 
 Angel Wing - : 
 Apikuni Mountain - : 
 Appistoki Peak - : 
 Bad Marriage Mountain - : 
 Battlement Mountain - ; 
 Bear Mountain - : 
 Bearhat Mountain - ; 
 Bearhead Mountain - : 
 Bishops Cap - : 
 Blackfoot Mountain -  : 
 Brave Dog Mountain - ; 
 Calf Robe Mountain - : 
 Caper Peak - ; 
 Cathedral Peak - : 
 Chief Mountain - : 
 Church Butte - ; 
 Citadel Mountain - : 
 Clements Mountain - : 
 Cloudcroft Peaks - ; 
 Clyde Peak - : 
 Cracker - : 
 Crowfeet Mountain - : 
 Curly Bear Mountain - : 
 Divide Mountain - : 
 Eagle Plume Mountain - : 
 Eagle Ribs Mountain - ; 
 Eaglehead Mountain - ; 
 East Flattop Mountain - : 

 Edwards Mountain - ; 
 Elk Mountain - : 
 Flinsch Peak - : 
 Fusillade Mountain -  : 
 Gable Mountain - : 
 Goat Haunt Mountain - : 
 Goat Mountain - : 
 Going-to-the-Sun Mountain - : 
 Grinnell Point - : 
 Grizzly Mountain - : 
 Gunsight Mountain - : 
 Iceberg Peak - : 
 Ipasha Peak - : 
 Kaina Mountain - : 
 Kaiser Point - : 
 Kootenai Peak - : 
 Kupunkamint Mountain - : 
 Little Chief Mountain - : 
 Little Dog Mountain - : 
 Little Matterhorn - : 
 Lone Walker Mountain - : 
 Mad Wolf Mountain - : 
 Mahtotopa Mountain - : 
 Matahpi Peak - : 
 McClintock Peak - : 
 Medicine Grizzly Peak - ; 
 Medicine Owl Peak - : 
 Miche Wabun Peak - : 
 Mount Brown -; 
 Mount Cannon - ; 
 Mount Cleveland - : 
 Mount Despair - ; 
 Mount Doody - ; 
 Mount Ellsworth - : 
 Mount Gould - : 
 Mount Grinnell - : 
 Mount Helen - : 
 Mount Henkel - : 
 Mount Henry - : 
 Mount Jackson - : 
 Mount James - : 
 Mount Kipp - : 
 Mount Logan - : 
 Mount Merritt - : 
 Mount Morgan - : 
 Mount Oberlin - ; 
 Mount Phillips - ; 
 Mount Pinchot - ; 
 Mount Rockwell - : 
 Mount Saint Nicholas -; 
 Mount Siyeh - : 
 Mount Stimson - ; 
 Mount Thompson - ; 
 Mount Wilbur - : 

 Natoas Peak - : 
 Never Laughs Mountain - : 
 Norris Mountain - : 
 Peril Peak - ; 
 Piegan Mountain - : 
 Pollock Mountain - : 
 Pyramid Peak - : 
 
 Razoredge Mountain - ; 
 Red Crow Mountain - : 
 Red Eagle Mountain - : 
 Red Mountain - : 
 Reynolds Mountain - : 
 Rising Wolf Mountain - : 
 Salvage Mountain - ; 
 Sarcee Mountain - : 
 Sentinel Mountain - : 
 Seward Mountain - : 
 Shaheeya Peak - : 
 Sheep Mountain - ; 
 Sherburne Peak - : 
 Sinopah Mountain - : 
 Split Mountain - : 
 Stoney Indian Peaks - : 
 Summit Mountain - : 
 Swiftcurrent Mountain - : 
 Triple Divide Peak - : 
 Tinkham Mountain -; 
 Vigil Peak - ; 
 Wahcheechee Mountain - : 
 Walton Mountain - ; 
 White Calf Mountain - : 
 Wolftail Mountain - ; 
 Wynn Mountain - : 
 Yellow Mountain - :

Livingston Range
The Livingston Range traverses the park in a generally north to south direction in the northwestern portions of the park.

 Anaconda Peak - ; 
 Boulder Peak - ; 
 Campbell Mountain -  : 
 Chapman Peak - ; 
 Heavens Peak - ; 
 Kinnerly Peak - ; 
 Kintla Peak - ; 
 Logging Mountain - ; 
 Longfellow Peak -; 
 McPartland Mountain - ; 
 Mount Carter - ; 
 Mount Custer - ; 
 Mount Geduhn -; 
 Mount Peabody - ; 
 Mount Vaught - ; 
 Nahsukin Mountain - : 
 Numa Peak - ; 
 Olson Mountain - ; 
 Parke Peak - ; 
 Paul Bunyans Cabin - ; 
 Rainbow Peak - ; 
 Redhorn Peak - ; 
 Reuter Peak - ; 
 Shaheeya Peak -  
 Square Peak - ; 
 The Guardhouse - ; 
 Thunderbird Mountain - : 
 Vulture Peak (Montana) - ;

Further reading

Notes

 
Lists of mountain ranges of the United States

Glacier
.
.